Hirpida is a genus of moths in the family Saturniidae first described by Max Wilhelm Karl Draudt in 1929.

Species
Hirpida boloviochoba Brechlin & Meister, 2010
Hirpida choba (Druce, 1904)
Hirpida chuquisaciana Brechlin & Meister, 2010
Hirpida gaujoni (Dognin, 1894)
Hirpida junopascoensis Brechlin & Meister, 2010
Hirpida juyjuylinea Brechlin & Meister, 2010
Hirpida levis (F. Johnson & Michener, 1948)
Hirpida levocuscoensis Brechlin & Meister, 2010
Hirpida levopascoensis Brechlin & Meister, 2010
Hirpida mavanschaycki Brechlin & Meister, 2010
Hirpida nigrolinea (Druce, 1904)
Hirpida olgae Brechlin & Meister, 2010
Hirpida pomacochasensis Brechlin & Meister, 2010
Hirpida santacruziana Brechlin & Meister, 2010
Hirpida sinjaevorum Brechlin & Meister, 2010

References

Hemileucinae